Hồ Thị Thu Hiền (born 4 November 1995) is a Vietnamese karateka. She won the gold medal in the women's kumite 68kg event at the 2017 Southeast Asian Games held in Kuala Lumpur, Malaysia. She also won one of the bronze medals in the women's kumite 61kg event at the 2019 Southeast Asian Games held in the Philippines.

She competed in the women's kumite 61 kg event at the 2018 Asian Games held in Jakarta, Indonesia.

In 2021, she won one of the bronze medals in her event at the Asian Karate Championships held in Almaty, Kazakhstan. She also won the gold medal in the women's team kumite event.

Achievements

References 

Living people
1995 births
Place of birth missing (living people)
Vietnamese female karateka
Karateka at the 2018 Asian Games
Asian Games competitors for Vietnam
Southeast Asian Games gold medalists for Vietnam
Southeast Asian Games bronze medalists for Vietnam
Southeast Asian Games medalists in karate
Competitors at the 2017 Southeast Asian Games
Competitors at the 2019 Southeast Asian Games
21st-century Vietnamese women